Pop art is an art movement that emerged in the United Kingdom and the United States during the mid- to late-1950s. The movement presented a challenge to traditions of fine art by including imagery from popular and mass culture, such as advertising, comic books and mundane mass-produced objects. One of its aims is to use images of popular culture in art, emphasizing the banal or kitschy elements of any culture, most often through the use of irony. It is also associated with the artists' use of mechanical means of reproduction or rendering techniques. In pop art, material is sometimes visually removed from its known context, isolated, or combined with unrelated material.

Amongst the early artists that shaped the pop art movement were Eduardo Paolozzi and Richard Hamilton in Britain, and Larry Rivers, Ray Johnson. Robert Rauschenberg and Jasper Johns among others in the United States. Pop art is widely interpreted as a reaction to the then-dominant ideas of abstract expressionism, as well as an expansion of those ideas. Due to its utilization of found objects and images, it is similar to Dada. Pop art and minimalism are considered to be art movements that precede postmodern art, or are some of the earliest examples of postmodern art themselves.

Pop art often takes imagery that is currently in use in advertising. Product labeling and logos figure prominently in the imagery chosen by pop artists, seen in the labels of Campbell's Soup Cans, by Andy Warhol. Even the labeling on the outside of a shipping box containing food items for retail has been used as subject matter in pop art, as demonstrated by Warhol's Campbell's Tomato Juice Box, 1964 (pictured).

Origins

The origins of pop art in North America developed differently from Great Britain. In the United States, pop art was a response by artists; it marked a return to hard-edged composition and representational art. They used impersonal, mundane reality, irony, and parody to "defuse" the personal symbolism and "painterly looseness" of abstract expressionism. In the U.S., some artwork by Larry Rivers, Alex Katz and Man Ray anticipated pop art.

By contrast, the origins of pop art in post-War Britain, while employing irony and parody, were more academic. Britain focused on the dynamic and paradoxical imagery of American pop culture as powerful, manipulative symbolic devices that were affecting whole patterns of life, while simultaneously improving the prosperity of a society. Early pop art in Britain was a matter of ideas fueled by American popular culture when viewed from afar.  Similarly, pop art was both an extension and a repudiation of Dadaism. While pop art and Dadaism explored some of the same subjects, pop art replaced the destructive, satirical, and anarchic impulses of the Dada movement with a detached affirmation of the artifacts of mass culture. Among those artists in Europe seen as producing work leading up to pop art are: Pablo Picasso, Marcel Duchamp, and Kurt Schwitters.

Proto-pop
Although both British and American pop art began during the 1950s, Marcel Duchamp and others in Europe like Francis Picabia and Man Ray predate the movement; in addition there were some earlier American proto-pop origins which utilized "as found" cultural objects. During the 1920s, American artists Patrick Henry Bruce, Gerald Murphy, Charles Demuth and Stuart Davis created paintings that contained pop culture imagery (mundane objects culled from American commercial products and advertising design), almost "prefiguring" the pop art movement.

United Kingdom: the Independent Group

The Independent Group (IG), founded in London in 1952, is regarded as the precursor to the pop art movement. They were a gathering of young painters, sculptors, architects, writers and critics who were challenging prevailing modernist approaches to culture as well as traditional views of fine art. Their group discussions centered on pop culture implications from elements such as mass advertising, movies, product design, comic strips, science fiction and technology. At the first Independent Group meeting in 1952, co-founding member, artist and sculptor Eduardo Paolozzi presented a lecture using a series of collages titled Bunk! that he had assembled during his time in Paris between 1947 and 1949. This material of "found objects" such as advertising, comic book characters, magazine covers and various mass-produced graphics mostly represented American popular culture. One of the collages in that presentation was Paolozzi's I was a Rich Man's Plaything (1947), which includes the first use of the word "pop", appearing in a cloud of smoke emerging from a revolver. Following Paolozzi's seminal presentation in 1952, the IG focused primarily on the imagery of American popular culture, particularly mass advertising.

According to the son of John McHale, the term "pop art" was first coined by his father in 1954 in conversation with Frank Cordell, although other sources credit its origin to British critic Lawrence Alloway. (Both versions agree that the term was used in Independent Group discussions by mid-1955.)

"Pop art" as a moniker was then used in discussions by IG members in the Second Session of the IG in 1955, and the specific term "pop art" first appeared in published print in the article "But Today We Collect Ads" by IG members Alison and Peter Smithson in Ark magazine in 1956. However, the term is often credited to British art critic/curator Lawrence Alloway for his 1958 essay titled The Arts and the Mass Media, even though the precise language he uses is "popular mass culture". "Furthermore, what I meant by it then is not what it means now. I used the term, and also 'Pop Culture' to refer to the products of the mass media, not to works of art that draw upon popular culture. In any case, sometime between the winter of 1954–55 and 1957 the phrase acquired currency in conversation..." Nevertheless, Alloway was one of the leading critics to defend the inclusion of the imagery of mass culture in the fine arts. Alloway clarified these terms in 1966, at which time Pop Art had already transited from art schools and small galleries to a major force in the artworld. But its success had not been in England. Practically simultaneously, and independently, New York City had become the hotbed for Pop Art.

In London, the annual Royal Society of British Artists (RBA) exhibition of young talent in 1960 first showed American pop influences. In January 1961, the most famous RBA-Young Contemporaries of all put David Hockney, the American R B Kitaj, New Zealander Billy Apple, Allen Jones, Derek Boshier, Joe Tilson, Patrick Caulfield, Peter Phillips, Pauline Boty and Peter Blake on the map; Apple designed the posters and invitations for both the 1961 and 1962 Young Contemporaries exhibitions. Hockney, Kitaj and Blake went on to win prizes at the John-Moores-Exhibition in Liverpool in the same year. Apple and Hockney traveled together to New York during the Royal College's 1961 summer break, which is when Apple first made contact with Andy Warhol – both later moved to the United States and Apple became involved with the New York pop art scene.

United States
Although pop art began in the early 1950s, in America it was given its greatest impetus during the 1960s. The term "pop art" was officially introduced in December 1962; the occasion was a "Symposium on Pop Art" organized by the Museum of Modern Art. By this time, American advertising had adopted many elements of modern art and functioned at a very sophisticated level. Consequently, American artists had to search deeper for dramatic styles that would distance art from the well-designed and clever commercial materials. As the British viewed American popular culture imagery from a somewhat removed perspective, their views were often instilled with romantic, sentimental and humorous overtones. By contrast, American artists, bombarded every day with the diversity of mass-produced imagery, produced work that was generally more bold and aggressive.

According to historian, curator and critic Henry Geldzahler, "Ray Johnson's collages Elvis Presley No. 1 and James Dean stand as the Plymouth Rock of the Pop movement." Author Lucy Lippard wrote that "The Elvis ... and Marilyn Monroe [collages] ... heralded Warholian Pop." Johnson worked as a graphic designer, met Andy Warhol by 1956 and both designed several book covers for New Directions and other publishers. Johnson began mailing out whimsical flyers advertising his design services printed via offset lithography. He later became known as the father of mail art as the founder of his "New York Correspondence School," working small by stuffing clippings and drawings into envelopes rather than working larger like his contemporaries. A note about the cover image in January 1958's Art News pointed out that "[Jasper] Johns' first one-man show ... places him with such better-known colleagues as Rauschenberg, Twombly, Kaprow and Ray Johnson".

Indeed, two other important artists in the establishment of America's pop art vocabulary were the painters Jasper Johns and Robert Rauschenberg. Rauschenberg, who like Ray Johnson attended Black Mountain College in North Carolina after World War II, was influenced by the earlier work of Kurt Schwitters and other Dada artists, and his belief that "painting relates to both art and life" challenged the dominant modernist perspective of his time. His use of discarded readymade objects (in his Combines) and pop culture imagery (in his silkscreen paintings) connected his works to topical events in everyday America. The silkscreen paintings of 1962–64 combined expressive brushwork with silkscreened magazine clippings from Life, Newsweek, and National Geographic. Johns' paintings of flags, targets, numbers, and maps of the U.S. as well three-dimensional depictions of ale cans drew attention to questions of representation in art. Johns' and Rauschenberg's work of the 1950s is frequently referred to as Neo-Dada, and is visually distinct from the prototypical American pop art which exploded in the early 1960s.

Roy Lichtenstein is of equal importance to American pop art. His work, and its use of parody, probably defines the basic premise of pop art better than any other. Selecting the old-fashioned comic strip as subject matter, Lichtenstein produces a hard-edged, precise composition that documents while also parodying in a soft manner. Lichtenstein used oil and Magna paint in his best known works, such as Drowning Girl (1963), which was appropriated from the lead story in DC Comics' Secret Hearts #83. (Drowning Girl is part of the collection of the Museum of Modern Art.) His work features thick outlines, bold colors and Ben-Day dots to represent certain colors, as if created by photographic reproduction. Lichtenstein said, "[abstract expressionists] put things down on the canvas and responded to what they had done, to the color positions and sizes. My style looks completely different, but the nature of putting down lines pretty much is the same; mine just don't come out looking calligraphic, like Pollock's or Kline's." Pop art merges popular and mass culture with fine art while injecting humor, irony, and recognizable imagery/content into the mix.

The paintings of Lichtenstein, like those of Andy Warhol, Tom Wesselmann and others, share a direct attachment to the commonplace image of American popular culture, but also treat the subject in an impersonal manner clearly illustrating the idealization of mass production.

Andy Warhol is probably the most famous figure in pop art. In fact, art critic Arthur Danto once called Warhol "the nearest thing to a philosophical genius the history of art has produced".  Warhol attempted to take pop beyond an artistic style to a life style, and his work often displays a lack of human affectation that dispenses with the irony and parody of many of his peers.

Early U.S. exhibitions

Claes Oldenburg, Jim Dine and Tom Wesselmann had their first shows in the Judson Gallery in 1959 and 1960 and later in 1960 through 1964 along with James Rosenquist, George Segal and others at the Green Gallery on 57th Street in Manhattan. In 1960, Martha Jackson showed installations and assemblages, New Media – New Forms featured Hans Arp, Kurt Schwitters, Jasper Johns, Claes Oldenburg, Robert Rauschenberg, Jim Dine and May Wilson. 1961 was the year of Martha Jackson's spring show, Environments, Situations, Spaces. Andy Warhol held his first solo exhibition in Los Angeles in July 1962 at Irving Blum's Ferus Gallery, where he showed 32 paintings of Campell's soup cans, one for every flavor. Warhol sold the set of paintings to Blum for $1,000; in 1996, when the Museum of Modern Art acquired it, the set was valued at $15 million.

Donald Factor, the son of Max Factor Jr., and an art collector and co-editor of avant-garde literary magazine Nomad, wrote an essay in the magazine's last issue, Nomad/New York. The essay was one of the first on what would become known as pop art, though Factor did not use the term. The essay, "Four Artists", focused on Roy Lichtenstein, James Rosenquist, Jim Dine, and Claes Oldenburg.

In the 1960s, Oldenburg, who became associated with the pop art movement, created many happenings, which were performance art-related productions of that time. The name he gave to his own productions was "Ray Gun Theater". The cast of colleagues in his performances included: artists Lucas Samaras, Tom Wesselmann, Carolee Schneemann, Öyvind Fahlström and Richard Artschwager; dealer Annina Nosei; art critic Barbara Rose; and screenwriter Rudy Wurlitzer. His first wife, Patty Mucha, who sewed many of his early soft sculptures, was a constant performer in his happenings. This brash, often humorous, approach to art was at great odds with the prevailing sensibility that, by its nature, art dealt with "profound" expressions or ideas. In December 1961, he rented a store on Manhattan's Lower East Side to house The Store, a month-long installation he had first presented at the Martha Jackson Gallery in New York, stocked with sculptures roughly in the form of consumer goods.

Opening in 1962, Willem de Kooning's New York art dealer, the Sidney Janis Gallery, organized the groundbreaking International Exhibition of the New Realists, a survey of new-to-the-scene American, French, Swiss, Italian New Realism, and British pop art. The fifty-four artists shown included Richard Lindner, Wayne Thiebaud, Roy Lichtenstein (and his painting Blam), Andy Warhol, Claes Oldenburg, James Rosenquist, Jim Dine, Robert Indiana, Tom Wesselmann, George Segal, Peter Phillips, Peter Blake (The Love Wall from 1961), Öyvind Fahlström, Yves Klein, Arman, Daniel Spoerri, Christo and Mimmo Rotella. The show was seen by Europeans Martial Raysse, Niki de Saint Phalle and Jean Tinguely in New York, who were stunned by the size and look of the American artwork. Also shown were Marisol, Mario Schifano, Enrico Baj and Öyvind Fahlström. Janis lost some of his abstract expressionist artists when Mark Rothko, Robert Motherwell, Adolph Gottlieb and Philip Guston quit the gallery, but gained Dine, Oldenburg, Segal and Wesselmann. At an opening-night soiree thrown by collector Burton Tremaine, Willem de Kooning appeared and was turned away by Tremaine, who ironically owned a number of de Kooning's works. Rosenquist recalled: "at that moment I thought, something in the art world has definitely changed". Turning away a respected abstract artist proved that, as early as 1962, the pop art movement had begun to dominate art culture in New York.

A bit earlier, on the West Coast, Roy Lichtenstein, Jim Dine and Andy Warhol from New York City; Phillip Hefferton and Robert Dowd from Detroit; Edward Ruscha and Joe Goode from Oklahoma City; and Wayne Thiebaud from California were included in the New Painting of Common Objects show. This first pop art museum exhibition in America was curated by Walter Hopps at the Pasadena Art Museum.  Pop art was ready to change the art world. New York followed Pasadena in 1963, when the Guggenheim Museum exhibited Six Painters and the Object, curated by Lawrence Alloway. The artists were Jim Dine, Jasper Johns, Roy Lichtenstein, Robert Rauschenberg, James Rosenquist, and Andy Warhol. Another pivotal early exhibition was The American Supermarket organised by the Bianchini Gallery in 1964. The show was presented as a typical small supermarket environment, except that everything in it—the produce, canned goods, meat, posters on the wall, etc.—was created by prominent pop artists of the time, including Apple, Warhol, Lichtenstein, Wesselmann, Oldenburg, and Johns. This project was recreated in 2002 as part of the Tate Gallery's Shopping: A Century of Art and Consumer Culture.

By 1962, pop artists started exhibiting in commercial galleries in New York and Los Angeles; for some, it was their first commercial one-man show. The Ferus Gallery presented Andy Warhol in Los Angeles (and Ed Ruscha in 1963). In New York, the Green Gallery showed Rosenquist, Segal, Oldenburg, and Wesselmann. The Stable Gallery showed R. Indiana and Warhol (in his first New York show). The Leo Castelli Gallery presented Rauschenberg, Johns, and Lichtenstein. Martha Jackson showed Jim Dine and Allen Stone showed Wayne Thiebaud. By 1966, after the Green Gallery and the Ferus Gallery closed, the Leo Castelli Gallery represented Rosenquist, Warhol, Rauschenberg, Johns, Lichtenstein and Ruscha. The Sidney Janis Gallery represented Oldenburg, Segal, Dine, Wesselmann and Marisol, while Allen Stone continued to represent Thiebaud, and Martha Jackson continued representing Robert Indiana.

In 1968, the São Paulo 9 Exhibition – Environment U.S.A.: 1957–1967 featured the "Who's Who" of pop art. Considered as a summation of the classical phase of the American pop art period, the exhibit was curated by William Seitz. The artists were Edward Hopper, James Gill, Robert Indiana, Jasper Johns, Roy Lichtenstein, Claes Oldenburg, Robert Rauschenberg, Andy Warhol and Tom Wesselmann.

France

Nouveau réalisme refers to an artistic movement founded in 1960 by the art critic Pierre Restany and the artist Yves Klein during the first collective exposition in the Apollinaire gallery in Milan. Pierre Restany wrote the original manifesto for the group, titled the "Constitutive Declaration of New Realism," in April 1960, proclaiming, "Nouveau Réalisme—new ways of perceiving the real." This joint declaration was signed on 27 October 1960, in Yves Klein's workshop, by nine people: Yves Klein, Arman, Martial Raysse, Pierre Restany, Daniel Spoerri, Jean Tinguely and the Ultra-Lettrists, Francois Dufrêne, Raymond Hains, Jacques de la Villeglé; in 1961 these were joined by César, Mimmo Rotella, then Niki de Saint Phalle and Gérard Deschamps. The artist Christo showed with the group. It was dissolved in 1970.

Contemporary of American Pop Art—often conceived as its transposition in France—new realism was along with Fluxus and other groups one of the numerous tendencies of the avant-garde in the 1960s. The group initially chose Nice, on the French Riviera, as its home base since Klein and Arman both originated there; new realism is thus often retrospectively considered by historians to be an early representative of the  movement. In spite of the diversity of their plastic language, they perceived a common basis for their work; this being a method of direct appropriation of reality, equivalent, in the terms used by Restany; to a "poetic recycling of urban, industrial and advertising reality".

Spain
In Spain, the study of pop art is associated with the "new figurative", which arose from the roots of the crisis of informalism. Eduardo Arroyo could be said to fit within the pop art trend, on account of his interest in the environment, his critique of our media culture which incorporates icons of both mass media communication and the history of painting, and his scorn for nearly all established artistic styles. However, the Spanish artist who could be considered most authentically part of "pop" art is Alfredo Alcaín, because of the use he makes of popular images and empty spaces in his compositions.

Also in the category of Spanish pop art is the "Chronicle Team" (El Equipo Crónica), which existed in Valencia between 1964 and 1981, formed by the artists Manolo Valdés and Rafael Solbes. Their movement can be characterized as "pop" because of its use of comics and publicity images and its simplification of images and photographic compositions. Filmmaker Pedro Almodóvar emerged from Madrid's "La Movida" subculture of the 1970s making low budget super 8 pop art movies, and he was subsequently called the Andy Warhol of Spain by the media at the time. In the book Almodovar on Almodovar, he is quoted as saying that the 1950s film "Funny Face" was a central inspiration for his work. One pop trademark in Almodovar's films is that he always produces a fake commercial to be inserted into a scene.

New Zealand 

In New Zealand, pop art has predominately flourished since the 1990s, and is often connected to Kiwiana. Kiwiana is a pop-centered, idealised representation of classically Kiwi icons, such as meat pies, kiwifruit, tractors, jandals, Four Square supermarkets; the inherent campness of this is often subverted to signify cultural messages. Dick Frizzell is a famous New Zealand pop artist, known for using older Kiwiana symbols in ways that parody modern culture. For example, Frizzell enjoys imitating the work of foreign artists, giving their works a unique New Zealand view or influence. This is done to show New Zealand's historically subdued impact on the world; naive art is connected to Aotearoan pop art this way.

This can be also done in an abrasive and deadpan way, as with Michel Tuffrey's famous work Pisupo Lua Afe (Corned Beef 2000). Of Samoan ancestry, Tuffery constructed the work, which represents a bull, out of processed food cans known as pisupo. It is a unique work of western pop art because Tuffrey includes themes of neocolonialism and racism against non-western cultures (signified by the food cans the work is made of, which represent economic dependence brought on Samoans by the west). The undeniable indigenous viewpoint makes it stand out against more common non-indigenous works of pop art.

One of New Zealand's earliest and famous pop artists is Billy Apple, one of the few non-British members of the Royal Society of British Artists. Featured among the likes of David Hockney, American R.B. Kitaj and Peter Blake in the January 1961 RBA exhibition Young Contemporaries, Apple quickly became an iconic international artist of the 1960s. This was before he conceived his moniker of 'Billy Apple", and his work was displayed under his birth name of Barrie Bates. He sought to distinguish himself by appearance as well as name, so bleached his hair and eyebrows with Lady Clairol Instant Creme Whip. Later, Apple was associated with the 1970s Conceptual Art movement.

Japan
In Japan, pop art evolved from the nation's prominent avant-garde scene. The use of images of the modern world, copied from magazines in the photomontage-style paintings produced by Harue Koga in the late 1920s and early 1930s, foreshadowed elements of pop art. The Japanese Gutai movement led to a 1958 Gutai exhibition at Martha Jackson’s New York gallery that preceded by two years her famous New Forms New Media show that put Pop Art on the map. The work of Yayoi Kusama contributed to the development of pop art and influenced many other artists, including Andy Warhol. In the mid-1960s, graphic designer Tadanori Yokoo became one of the most successful pop artists and an international symbol for Japanese pop art. He is well known for his advertisements and creating artwork for pop culture icons such as commissions from The Beatles, Marilyn Monroe, and Elizabeth Taylor, among others. Another leading pop artist at that time was Keiichi Tanaami. Iconic characters from Japanese manga and anime have also become symbols for pop art, such as Speed Racer and Astro Boy. Japanese manga and anime also influenced later pop artists such as Takashi Murakami and his superflat movement.

Italy
In Italy, by 1964, pop art was known and took different forms, such as the "Scuola di Piazza del Popolo" in Rome, with pop artists such as Mario Schifano, Franco Angeli, Giosetta Fioroni, Tano Festa, Claudio Cintoli, and some artworks by Piero Manzoni, Lucio Del Pezzo, Mimmo Rotella and Valerio Adami.

Italian pop art originated in 1950s culture – the works of the artists Enrico Baj and Mimmo Rotella to be precise, rightly considered the forerunners of this scene. In fact, it was around 1958–1959 that Baj and Rotella abandoned their previous careers (which might be generically defined as belonging to a non-representational genre, despite being thoroughly post-Dadaist), to catapult themselves into a new world of images, and the reflections on them, which was springing up all around them. Rotella's torn posters showed an ever more figurative taste, often explicitly and deliberately referring to the great icons of the times. Baj's compositions were steeped in contemporary kitsch, which turned out to be a "gold mine" of images and the stimulus for an entire generation of artists.

The novelty came from the new visual panorama, both inside "domestic walls" and out-of-doors. Cars, road signs, television, all the "new world", everything can belong to the world of art, which itself is new. In this respect, Italian pop art takes the same ideological path as that of the international scene. The only thing that changes is the iconography and, in some cases, the presence of a more critical attitude toward it. Even in this case, the prototypes can be traced back to the works of Rotella and Baj, both far from neutral in their relationship with society. Yet this is not an exclusive element; there is a long line of artists, including Gianni Ruffi, Roberto Barni, Silvio Pasotti, Umberto Bignardi, and Claudio Cintoli, who take on reality as a toy, as a great pool of imagery from which to draw material with disenchantment and frivolity, questioning the traditional linguistic role models with a renewed spirit of "let me have fun" à la Aldo Palazzeschi.

Belgium
In Belgium, pop art was represented to some extent by Paul Van Hoeydonck, whose sculpture Fallen Astronaut was left on the Moon during one of the Apollo missions, as well as by other notable pop artists. Internationally recognized artists such as Marcel Broodthaers ( 'vous êtes doll? "), Evelyne Axell and Panamarenko are indebted to the pop art movement; Broodthaers's great influence was George Segal. Another well-known artist, Roger Raveel, mounted a birdcage with a real live pigeon in one of his paintings. By the end of the 1960s and early 1970s, pop art references disappeared from the work of some of these artists when they started to adopt a more critical attitude towards America because of the Vietnam War's increasingly gruesome character. Panamarenko, however, has retained the irony inherent in the pop art movement up to the present day. Evelyne Axell from Namur was a prolific pop-artist in the 1964–1972 period. Axell was one of the first female pop artists, had been mentored by Magritte and her best-known painting is Ice Cream.

Netherlands
While there was no formal pop art movement in the Netherlands, there were a group of artists that spent time in New York during the early years of pop art, and drew inspiration from the international pop art movement. Representatives of Dutch pop art include Daan van Golden, Gustave Asselbergs, Jacques Frenken, Jan Cremer, Wim T. Schippers, and Woody van Amen. They opposed the Dutch petit bourgeois mentality by creating humorous works with a serious undertone. Examples of this nature include Sex O'Clock, by Woody van Amen, and Crucifix / Target, by Jacques Frenken.

Russia

Russia was a little late to become part of the pop art movement, and some of the artwork that resembles pop art only surfaced around the early 1970s, when Russia was a communist country and bold artistic statements were closely monitored. Russia's own version of pop art was Soviet-themed and was referred to as Sots Art. After 1991, the Communist Party lost its power, and with it came a freedom to express. Pop art in Russia took on another form, epitomised by Dmitri Vrubel with his painting titled My God, Help Me to Survive This Deadly Love in 1990. It might be argued that the Soviet posters made in the 1950s to promote the wealth of the nation were in itself a form of pop art.

Notable artists

Billy Apple (1935–2021)
Evelyne Axell (1935–1972)
Sir Peter Blake (born 1932)
Derek Boshier (born 1937)
Pauline Boty (1938–1966)
Patrick Caulfield (1936–2005)
Allan D'Arcangelo (1930–1998)
Jim Dine (born 1935)
Burhan Dogancay (1929–2013)
Rosalyn Drexler (born 1926)
Robert Dowd (1936–1996)
Ken Elias (born 1944)
Erró (born 1932)
Marisol Escobar (1930–2016)
James Gill (born 1934)
Dorothy Grebenak (1913–1990)
Red Grooms (born 1937)
Richard Hamilton (1922–2011)
Keith Haring (1958–1990)
Jann Haworth (born 1942)
David Hockney (born 1937)
Dorothy Iannone (born 1933)
Robert Indiana (1928–2018)
Jasper Johns (born 1930)
Ray Johnson (1927–1995)
Allen Jones (born 1937)
Alex Katz (born 1927)
Corita Kent (1918–1986)
Konrad Klapheck (born 1935)
Kiki Kogelnik (1935–1997)
Nicholas Krushenick (1929–1999)
Yayoi Kusama (born 1929)
Gerald Laing (1936–2011)
Roy Lichtenstein (1923–1997)
Richard Lindner (1901–1978)
John McHale (1922–1978)
Peter Max (born 1937)
Marta Minujin (born 1943)
Claes Oldenburg (1929-2022)
Julian Opie (born 1958)
Eduardo Paolozzi (1924–2005)
Peter Phillips (born 1939)
Sigmar Polke (1941–2010)
Hariton Pushwagner (1940–2018)
Mel Ramos (1935–2018)
Robert Rauschenberg (1925–2008)
Larry Rivers (1923–2002)
James Rizzi (1950–2011)
James Rosenquist (1933–2017)
Niki de Saint Phalle (1930–2002)
Peter Saul (born 1934)
George Segal (1924–2000)
Colin Self (born 1941)
Marjorie Strider (1931–2014)
Elaine Sturtevant (1924–2014)
Wayne Thiebaud (1920–2021)
Joe Tilson (born 1928)
Andy Warhol (1928–1987)
Idelle Weber (1932–2020)
John Wesley (1928-2022)
Tom Wesselmann (1931–2004)

See also

Art pop
Chicago Imagists
Ferus Gallery
Sidney Janis
Leo Castelli
Green Gallery
New Painting of Common Objects
Figuration Libre (art movement)
Lowbrow (art movement)
Nouveau réalisme
Neo-pop
Op art
Plop art
Retro art
Superflat
SoFlo Superflat

References

Further reading
Bloch, Mark. The Brooklyn Rail. "Gutai: 1953 –1959", June 2018.
Diggory, Terence (2013) Encyclopedia of the New York School Poets (Facts on File Library of American Literature). 
Francis, Mark and Foster, Hal (2010) Pop. London and New York: Phaidon.
Haskell, Barbara (1984) BLAM! The Explosion of Pop, Minimalism and Performance 1958–1964. New York: W.W. Norton & Company, Inc. in association with the Whitney Museum of American Art.
 Lifshitz, Mikhail, The Crisis of Ugliness: From Cubism to Pop-Art. Translated and with an Introduction by David Riff. Leiden: BRILL, 2018 (originally published in Russian by Iskusstvo, 1968).
Lippard, Lucy R. (1966) Pop Art, with contributions by Lawrence Alloway, Nancy Marmer, Nicolas Calas, Frederick A. Praeger, New York.
Selz, Peter (moderator); Ashton, Dore; Geldzahler, Henry; Kramer, Hilton; Kunitz, Stanley and Steinberg, Leo (April 1963) "A symposium on Pop Art" Arts Magazine, pp. 36–45. Transcript of symposium held at the Museum of Modern Art on December 13, 1962.

External links

Pop Art: A Brief History, MoMA Learning
Pop Art in Modern and Contemporary Art, The Met
Brooklyn Museum Exhibitions: Seductive Subversion: Women Pop Artists, 1958–1968, Oct. 2010-Jan. 2011
Brooklyn Museum, Wiki/Pop (Women Pop Artists)
Tate Glossary term for Pop art

 
Avant-garde art
Modern art
Contemporary art movements
Western art
British art
1940s in art
1950s in art
1960s in art
Popular culture
American art
Postmodern art